Johann Wohler (born 14 January 1985) is a Namibian rugby union player. His regular position is hooker, but he can also play as a loose-forward.

Rugby career

Wohler was born in Rehoboth, then in South-West Africa, but part of modern-day Namibia.

External links

References

Namibian rugby union players
Living people
1985 births
People from Rehoboth, Namibia
Rugby union hookers
Rugby union flankers
Namibia international rugby union players